Ksenia Kablukova (born 16 June 1998) is a Russian ski jumper. She has competed at World Cup level since the 2015/16 season, with her best individual result being 14th place in Pyeongchang on 15 February 2017. At the 2018 Junior World Championships in Kandersteg, she won a team silver medal.

References

1998 births
Living people
Russian female ski jumpers